Nana Kuntunkunuku II (born Alexander Kwadwo Fredua Agyeman  22 February 1942 – 17 March 1999) was a traditional ruler in Ghana and Paramount Chief of Akyem-Abuakwa in the Eastern Region. His official title was Okyehene - King of Akyem. He was the seventh president of the National House of Chiefs and served from 1998 to 1999. He succeeded Nana Ofori Atta III who was his uncle and ruled the Akyems for 23 years. He was succeeded by Nana Amoatia Ofori Panin II.

Early life
Fredua Agyeman was born on 22 February 1942, at Kyebi to Samuel Joseph Okoampa Agyeman and Juliana Abena Akoto
 
In 1957, he entered Prempeh College and obtained his GCE Ordinary level Certificate in 1961. He was a member of the pioneering sixth form class of the Accra Academy between 1961 and 1962. His training as a medical doctor begun at the Sofia University in Bulgaria and was continued at the Charles University in Prague, Czechoslovakia where he graduated in 1970.

Career
In 1972, he practiced medicine at the Korle-Bu Hospital on his return to Ghana. In 1974, he joined the Ridge Hospital in Accra. He worked as well in the Castle Clinic and was medical officer in charge of the Stadium Clinic in Accra.

In 1976, he was selected as King of Akyem Abuakwa. He was installed on August 2, 1976, as the 34th occupant of the Ofori Panin Stool at the age of 34. As chief, he tried to encourage investors, mostly foreign, to start businesses on Akyem lands and in Ghana, travelling and having meetings in western European nations.
  
Between 1994 and 1998 he served two terms as president of the Eastern regional House of Chiefs. He served as the chairman of the lands committee of the national house of chiefs. He served as representative of the Eastern regional House of chiefs to the Constituent Assembly which drafted the Ghanaian constitution in 1992. He was a member of the Eastern regional coordinating Council. In 1998 he was elected president of the National House of Chiefs and became a member of the council of state.

Personal life 
He was married and left behind 6 children. He had a wife and children from 3 previous marriages.

Death 
He died on Wednesday, March 17 at dawn after a short illness at 37 Military Hospital.

Legacies 
During his reign, there was an increase in the number of educational institutions in the Akyem Abukwa Traditional area. He also established some second-cycle schools in the Atiwa Constituency. Abuakwa Constituency also had some second-cycle schools established there.

He also established gold mines in the traditional area his reign.

He also listened to complains of the people in some surrounding villages about the environmental problem caused by some gold mines. Surface gold mining led to the pollution of water bodies in those areas.

He also elevated a number of Odikros or Care takers to paramountcy.

References 

Ghanaian leaders
People from Eastern Region (Ghana)
1942 births
1999 deaths
Ghanaian royalty
Alumni of the Accra Academy